Žač is a village/settlement in the Istog Municipality of Kosovo. The village was in the spotlight in 2010, when Serbian refugees were denied the right to return to their homes.

Population

Albanians boycotted the census in 1991, so their numbers for that year are not known.

See also
Anti-Serb sentiment

Annotations

References

Villages in Istog